Mohamad Sahrizan bin Saidin is a Malaysian professional footballer who plays as a midfielder for Malaysia Super League club Sabah.

References

External links

Living people
Malaysian footballers
Sabah F.C. (Malaysia) players
Association football midfielders
People from Sabah
1999 births